Silvio Werner Denz (born 14 September 1956 in Basel, Switzerland) is a Swiss entrepreneur and art collector. He worked for various companies in Switzerland and the United States in finance, retail and marketing. The Swiss business magazine Bilanz ranks him among the 300 wealthiest Swiss citizens and among the 100 most important figures of the Swiss economy.

Entrepreneur

Perfume, cosmetics and fine spirits
In 1980 Silvio Denz took over the management of Zurich-based Alrodo AG, which was owned by his father and uncle. Initially with eight employees, the company purchased perfumes and cosmetics for imported perfumery retailers. After acquiring all the equity in Alrodo in 1984, the company grew to be Switzerland's largest perfumery chain, with 120 branches. Between 1980 and 2000, the number of employees rose from 8 to 800. In 2000 Denz sold Alrodo to the French perfumery chain Marionnaud. In the same year he founded Lalique Group (formerly known as Art & Fragrance) specializing in the creation, production and marketing of perfume and cosmetic brands such as Perfumes Alain Delon, Parfums Grès, Perfumes Lalique, Jaguar Fragrances, Bentley Fragrances, Ultrasun and most recently, fragrances for Brioni. On 28 March 2019, Lalique Groaup completed the acquisition of 50% of Glenturret distillery, one of Scotland's oldest working single malt whisky distilleries, further expanding its portfolio in the luxury goods market. In July 2022, Silvio Denz – together with entrepreneur Peter Spuhler – acquired the Hotel Florhof in Zurich. After a careful renovation in the Lalique style, this historical building will reopen its doors as ‘Villa Florhof’ in 2024.

Luxury
Silvio Denz accumulated the world's largest private collection of vintage perfume bottles designed by René Lalique, comprising over 650 original pieces. In 2008 the company acquired the French crystal warehouse Lalique S.A. The group became profitable again after being restructured, with branding focused on art, decorative items, interior design, jewelry, perfume and hospitality. Co-branding projects were developed between Lalique and various other luxury brands (including Bentley, The Macallan and Steinway & Sons). Collaborations were also signed with artists such as Zaha Hadid, Jean-Michel Jarre, Damien Hirst, and Elton John, resulting in collections for the company. In 2011, the Lalique museum in Wingen-sur-Moder (Alsace) opened to display more than 650 pieces designed by René Lalique and his successors, including jewelry, crystal and decorative glass. Denz loaned 230 pieces from his personal collection, mostly perfume bottles. Denz also converted René Lalique's villa in Wingen-sur-Moder into a luxury hotel and restaurant, which opened in September 2015 and holds two Michelin stars. Chef Paul Stradner presides over the restaurant.

Wine
In 1994 Silvio Denz, Franz Wermuth and five other partners, founded Les Grand Vins Wermuth S.A., now split into Denz Weine (distribution) and Wermuth Auktionen AG (auctions) in Zurich. In 1998, acting with the same partners, he bought the Clos d'Agon estate on the Costa Brava, which is overseen by the oenologist Peter Sisseck (Dominio Pingus). In 2020, Silvio Denz sold his stake in Clos d’Agon.

In 2005, on the recommendation of his friend Count Stephan von Neipperg (Château Canon-la-Gaffelière and La Mondotte), Denz bought the Château Faugères estate, six kilometers east of Saint Emilion. Faugères, which has 30 employees, comprises three vineyards: Château Faugères, Château Péby Faugères, both lying in the Saint-Emilion appellation, and Château Cap-de-Faugères in Côtes de Castillion. In 2010, he and Peter Sisseck took over the vineyard of Château Rocheyron in Saint-Emilion. The estates in Bordeaux cover a total of 120 hectares.

The winery at Château Faugères was designed by the architect Mario Botta. He describes his creation as a "cathedral of wine". Using modern technology coupled with traditional methods, such as gravity-filling, the wines are aged in oak barrels. In 2012 Château Faugères and Château Péby Faugères were awarded the status of Grand Cru Classé of Saint-Emilion. According to the wine critic Robert Parker, Château Péby Faugères today ranks among the finest Bordeaux wines. In 2015 the influential Parker's Wine Buyer's Guide rated Château Péby Faugères Vintage 2005 100/100. In February 2014, Silvio Denz acquired Château Lafaurie-Peyraguey, one of the few Premiers Grands Crus Classés of 1855 and one of the oldest vineyards in Sauternes. n 2018, the luxury hotel and gourmet restaurant was inaugurated at the Château Lafaurie-Peyraguey, today a member of the Relais & Châteaux collection and a 5-star-hotel. Chef Jérôme Schilling and the «Lalique” restaurant were awarded the first Michelin star in 2019.

On 17 September 2017, Silvio Denz was inducted as a Saint-Emilion Jurat. The Jurade of Saint-Emilion currently consists of 127 Jurats and more than 3000 Saint-Emilion wine ambassadors worldwide. In October 2017, he was awarded a Special Jury Prize from Fond’Action Alsace for his active involvement in the Alsace region. In the same month, he then went on to receive the Guillon d’Or award from the Guillon d’Or award, a Vaudois wine brotherhood founded in 1954, commending his passion and performance in the world of wine.

The French wine magazine «La Revue du Vin » counts Silvio Denz among the 200 most important wine personalities of 2018 and the Swiss Magazine Vinum awarded Silvio Denz among the 25 most important wine personalities of 2022.

Property
In 2003 Silvio Denz entered the real estate business in London. Working with local partners, he buys, renovates, and then resells traditional town houses in Mayfair, Knightsbridge and Kensington.

Personal life 
He has one son, born in 1988.

Collector

Pictures
Silvio Denz collects works of art via his company Art & Trade.

Wine
He has been buying vintage wines for over 30 years, mainly from Bordeaux. His private cellar contains more than 35,000 bottles.

Crystal
His interest in perfume bottles dates from his time at Alrodo. Today, he is the owner of the world's largest private collection of bottles by the celebrated French glass artist René Lalique.

Awards and memberships
Honorary Officer « Coteaux de Champagne » (October 7 2022); Silvio Denz is "Commandeur de la Commanderie du Bontemps de Médoc, des Graves, de Sauternes et de Barsac" (17 May 2019); Member of the Board of Directors Lindt & Sprüngli (2018); Distinction "Les 200 personnalités du vin", La Revue du vin de France (2018), Member "Chaîne des Rôtisseurs", Alsace (2018); Saint-Emilion Jurat, The Jurade of Saint-Emilion 17 September (2017); Special Jury Prize, Fond’Action Alsace (2017); The Guillon d’Or award, Confrérie du Guillon (2017); Member "Keepers of the Quaich", Scotland(2015); Honorary member, Confrérie Saint-Etienne d'Alsace (2017); Member "Club Prosper Montagne" (2016)

References

External links
Bilanz.ch
Arts & Fragrances S.A.
Les Grands Vins Wermuth S.A.
Clos d'Agon 
Château Faugères
 Lalique S.A.
Musée Lalique

Swiss businesspeople
Swiss winemakers
People from Basel-Stadt
1956 births
Living people